2DBO, branded on-air as Triple M Dubbo 93.5, is an Australian radio station owned by Southern Cross Austereo. The station is based in Dubbo, New South Wales.

It is also broadcast on relay transmitters in Gilgandra (101.3 FM), and Narromine (94.9 FM).

Radio stations in New South Wales
Classic hits radio stations in Australia
Southern Cross Media Group
Dubbo